Semor C. Tofte (August 30, 1911 – November 21, 1994) was an American politician who served in the Iowa House of Representatives from 1973 to 1985.

He died of a heart attack on November 21, 1994, in Rochester, Minnesota at age 83.

References

1911 births
1994 deaths
Republican Party members of the Iowa House of Representatives
20th-century American politicians